Roger Tallroth may refer to:

Roger Tallroth (musician) (born 1958), singer
Roger Tallroth (wrestler), wrestler and Olympic silver medalist